Tor research station is a Norwegian Antarctic research station in Queen Maud Land.

Overview
Tor was established in 1992, for the purpose of ornithological studies.

The Tor station is located in the Svarthamaren Protected Area in Queen Maud Land, the easternmost part of Princess Martha Coast at Svarthamaren Mountain.  It is located 1625 metres above sea level, about 200 km from the coast.

Tor is smaller than the other Norwegian station, Troll and is only staffed in the summer.

It is situated about 100 km from Troll.

See also
 List of Antarctic research stations
 List of Antarctic field camps
 Crime in Antarctica

References

External links 
 Official website Norwegian Polar Institute
 Dronning Maud Land Air Network
 Tor Research Station 
 COMNAP Antarctic Facilities
 COMNAP Antarctic Facilities Map

Outposts of Queen Maud Land
Princess Astrid Coast
Norway and the Antarctic
1993 establishments in Antarctica